Qaxbaş (also, Kakhbash) is 
a village and the most populous municipality, except for the capital Qax, in the Qakh Rayon of Azerbaijan. It has a population of 2,983. The municipality consists of the villages of Qaxbaş. it is historic Georgian village Kakhistavi. great majority of population are ethnic Georgians and Kiçik Alatəmir.

References 

Populated places in Qakh District